Athletes from Iran competed at the 2000 Summer Olympics in Sydney, Australia.

Competitors

Medal summary

Medal table

Medalists

Results by event

Aquatics

Swimming 

Men

Athletics 

Men

Boxing 

Men

Canoeing

Sprint 

Men

Cycling

Road 

Men

Equestrian 

Jumping

Judo 

Men

Shooting 

Women

Table tennis 

Men

Taekwondo 

 
Men

Weightlifting 

Men

Wrestling 

Men's freestyle

Men's Greco-Roman

References

External links
International Olympic Committee Web Site

Nations at the 2000 Summer Olympics
2000 Summer Olympics
Olympics, Summer